Burning Sun may refer to:

 Burning Sun scandal
 Burning Sun (EP), by German power metal band Helloween (2012) or its title track